Philippa Marion Roe, Baroness Couttie (25 September 1962 – 12 December 2022) was a British Conservative politician, who served as Leader of Westminster City Council from 2012 to 2017. Before entering public life she was an investment banker with Citigroup.

Early life and education
Born in Hampstead and educated at the University of St Andrews, Roe was a director of Citigroup before entering politics in 2006. The daughter of James Roe and former Conservative MP Dame Marion Roe, Philippa had a younger sister and younger brother. In 1982, she became the first student in 572 years to be elected to the University of St Andrews Senate, the institution's governing body.

Career 
After leaving university, Roe began her career in the public relations industry, joining Burson Marsteller.

In the 1990s, she served on a panel of experts from the private sector consulted by the Conservative government in establishing the private finance initiative, and in 2004 Roe was the joint author of a report called "Reforming the Private Finance Initiative", published by the Centre for Policy Studies.

Roe gave up her job at Citigroup when she became the mother of twins. In 2006, soon after this, Roe was elected to Westminster City Council, representing the three-member Knightsbridge and Belgravia ward, a safe seat for her party. At that time, she had recently recovered from cancer.

She was appointed a governor of Imperial College London and in 2008 became the member of Westminster's cabinet for Housing. In May 2010, Roe was re-elected as a councillor, and in June that year, she stated her support for the new coalition government's decision to cap housing benefit at £400 a week. In 2011, she took on the cabinet portfolio of Strategic Finance. The next year she succeeded Colin Barrow as Leader of the council, beating Edward Argar for the nomination, and quickly distanced herself from a comparison with a predecessor, Dame Shirley Porter.

The same year, she took over the role of chairman of the statutory Health and Wellbeing Board for Westminster. She also sat on the London Enterprise Panel. In 2013, she was quoted as saying that "local people know best" and that "The funding challenge is an opportunity to break free of orthodoxy and review all the services provided and how they can be delivered more efficiently."

She was re-elected as a councillor in 2014 and topped the poll, with the Conservative ward candidates taking 79.6 per cent of the vote. She did not stand as a councillor at the 2018 election.

In July 2015, Roe announced that she was seeking her party's nomination to stand as Mayor of London at the May 2016 election. However, she was not shortlisted by the Conservatives.

Roe was nominated for a life peerage in David Cameron's Resignation Honours and was created Baroness Couttie, of Downe in the County of Kent, on 5 September 2016. Couttie was the surname of her husband Stephen.

Personal life and death 
Roe married Stephen Couttie, a partner in the private equity firm Collabrium Capital, in September 2002. After fertility treatment in the United States, she gave birth to twins, Angus and Genevieve, in August 2005.

Baroness Couttie died of cancer on 12 December 2022, at the age of 60. Several of her former council colleagues paid tribute to her.

References

External links

 The Leader and the Cabinet at westminster.gov.uk (official site)
 Leader of Westminster City Council at Westminster Conservatives (party site)
 Philippa Roe, Why I am running to be Mayor of London at ConservativeHome
 Pippa Crerar, Tory mayoral hopeful: I would give more power to London's town halls dated 25 July 2015 in London Evening Standard online

1962 births
2022 deaths
20th-century British businesswomen
21st-century British businesswomen
Businesspeople from London
Conservative Party (UK) life peers
Conservative Party (UK) councillors
Politicians from London
Alumni of the University of St Andrews
Councillors in the City of Westminster
Leaders of local authorities of England
Women councillors in England
Life peeresses created by Elizabeth II
Place of death missing
Deaths from cancer
People from Hampstead